Sonia Reyes Sáez (born 30 October 1977) is a Spanish taekwondo practitioner, who competed in the women's featherweight category. She was born in Guadalajara. Considered one of the world's top favorites in her respective category, Reyes picked up a total of five medals in her career, including three bronze from the World Taekwondo Championships, and finished fourth in the 57-kg division at the 2004 Summer Olympics. Throughout her sporting career, Reyes trained full-time for Club Sung Dae Kwan in Madrid, under head coach and master Song Dae-young.

Reyes started her taekwondo career by becoming a bronze medalist in the 51-kg division at the 1992 European Junior Championships in Paris, France. Seven years later, she picked up another bronze on her first senior stint in the podium at the World Championships in Edmonton, Canada. Although she failed to earn a spot on the Spanish team to the 2000 Summer Olympics, Reyes continued to achieve remarkable results and yield more medals in her career list, including a silver from the European Championships in Patras, Greece, losing the final to Dutch fighter Virginia Lourens.

At the 2004 Summer Olympics in Athens, Reyes qualified for the Spanish taekwondo squad in the women's featherweight class (57 kg) by granting a berth and placing first in the final match against Russia's Margarita Mkrtchyan from the European Olympic Qualifying Tournament in Baku, Azerbaijan. She opened her match with a marvelous 11–2 victory over Poland's Aleksandra Uścińska, before narrowly losing the quarterfinal to South Korean taekwondo jin and world-ranked no. 2 Jang Ji-won at 2–3. In the repechage rounds, Reyes came from behind to dispatch Ivory Coast's Mariam Bah (5–0) and Thailand's Nootcharin Sukkhongdumnoen (6–3) for a chance to compete in the bronze medal match, where she fell short to Mexico's Iridia Salazar with a close 2–1 record, relegating Reyes to fourth position.

Notes

References

External links
  
 
 
 

1977 births
Living people
Spanish female taekwondo practitioners
Olympic taekwondo practitioners of Spain
Taekwondo practitioners at the 2004 Summer Olympics
People from Guadalajara, Spain
Sportspeople from the Province of Guadalajara
World Taekwondo Championships medalists
European Taekwondo Championships medalists
20th-century Spanish women